Safe, Swift and Smart Passage (S-PaSS) is an online travel management system of the Department of Science and Technology used for domestic travel during the COVID-19 pandemic in the Philippines when varying levels of travel restrictions was imposed in local government units. It is used as a platform for individuals to check on prevailing travel policies and requirements in a specific LGU as well as secure travel coordination permits (TCP) and travel pass-through permits (TPP) from local governments.

Described as a "one-stop online communication and coordination platform for travelers and local government units", S-PaSS was launched on March 26, 2021. It was developed by the DOST's Region VI (Western Visayas) office.

As of October 1, 2021, the S-PaSS have at least 3 million registered users.

References

2021 establishments in the Philippines
COVID-19 pandemic in the Philippines
Impact of the COVID-19 pandemic on tourism
Impact of the COVID-19 pandemic on transport
Software associated with the COVID-19 pandemic